Dobrino is a rural locality (a selo) in Tresorukovskoye Rural Settlement, Liskinsky District, Voronezh Oblast, Russia. The population was 496 as of 2010. There are 6 streets.

Geography 
Dobrino is located 35 km north of Liski (the district's administrative centre) by road. Tresorukovo is the nearest rural locality.

References 

Rural localities in Liskinsky District